The British Automation and Robot Association (BARA) is a UK trade membership organisation headquartered in Wallington, Surrey.

History
BARA was founded as the British Robot Association (BRA) in 1977.

As a trade and academic membership association, BRA members principally comprised automation vendors, end users, research and educational establishments; all of which had an interest in the development of the robotics and automation sector in the UK.

In 1981, BRA sponsored Automan, the UK's first automated manufacturing conference and exhibition in Brighton run by Reed Exhibitions.   The event moved to the National Exhibition Centre in Birmingham in 1983 and continued as a biennial event until 1991.

BRA was one of the founder members of the International Federation on Robots (IFR), a not-for-profit organisation in Frankfurt, Germany, in 1987. 

Following the introduction of automatic equipment within the industrial manufacturing sector, BRA took the decision to change its name to BARA in 1999 to incorporate automation.

In 2009, BARA became part of the PPMA Group of Associations trading brand, which represents a range of processing equipment and packaging machinery manufacturers, robot and automation, and machine vision suppliers in England, Wales, Scotland and Northern Ireland, and across Western Europe and North America.

In June 2022, BARA announced that it would co-host a new Automation UK exhibition in conjunction with UKIVA's Machine Vision Conference and Exhibition at the Coventry Building Society Arena (CBS) Arena in Coventry on 20-21 June 2023.

References

External links
 BARA
 International Federation of Robotics

1977 establishments in the United Kingdom
Electronics industry in the United Kingdom
Industrial robotics
Trade associations based in the United Kingdom
Manufacturing in the United Kingdom
Organizations established in 1977
Robotics in the United Kingdom
Robotics organizations
University of Warwick